Li Jingjing (born 15 June 1994) is a Chinese rower. She competed in the women's eight event at the 2020 Summer Olympics.

References

External links
 

1994 births
Living people
Chinese female rowers
Olympic rowers of China
Rowers at the 2020 Summer Olympics
Place of birth missing (living people)
Asian Games gold medalists for China
Rowers at the 2018 Asian Games
Asian Games medalists in rowing
Medalists at the 2018 Asian Games
Medalists at the 2020 Summer Olympics
Olympic medalists in rowing
Olympic bronze medalists for China
20th-century Chinese women
21st-century Chinese women